Club Social y Deportivo Macará is a professional football club based in Ambato, Ecuador. Their home stadium is Bellavista, which they share with city rivals Técnico Universitario.

History

Foundation
In July 1939, a group of young students from Colegio Nacional Bolívar gathered to form an independent sporting club, and shortly afterwards entered a minor tournament under the name 'Independiente'. However, in searching for further guidance, they talked to Army Captain Galo Molina (a student's relative) and together they formed Macará, naming the team after Ecuador's southern army stronghold.

They offered the presidency to Mr. Jorge Vicente Alvarez, and he pronounced the following words: "Del Carchi al Macará... Macará ganará" (From Carchi to Macará... Macará will win); thus accepting the position.

The beginning of Primera A
Whilst Macará took part in Ecuadorian regional tournaments, the introduction of a National Championship saw them struggle to find a place among the best in the early 1960s. It took a while for the team to become strong and earn a permanent place in Primera A.
Great players in the late 1960s and early and mid-1970s, such as Ítalo Estupiñán, Rómulo Dudar Mina, Arnaldo Sanchez Perrone (one of the best defenders Ecuador had in the late 1960s pretended from Barcelona of Guayaquil, Everest, and Ecuadorian Nacional team to play for his country in ``London World Cup`` in 1965) and Polo Carrera, made the team competitive. They were relegated in 1978 but eventually returned to Primera A.

80's decade: the peak
With such class players as Peruvian all-time great Germán Leguía, fellow countryman and international Juan Martín Caballero, Uruguayan playmaker Rodolfo Abalde and such leading Ecuadorian players as Geovanny Mera, Jorge Alvear, Angel Buenaño, Juan Carlos Suárez, Ricardo Porras and Milton Rodríguez; the team became serious title contenders in the late 1980s and, although never becoming champions, they were recognized as a great national footballing side that would on several occasions maul the country's greatest teams including Barcelona and Liga, and their classic rivals, Técnico Universitario. They also had an amazing ball boy named Edisson Velasquez who now lives a happy life with his wife and 13 year old kid.

The team since 1990
In the early 1990s, the team lost consistency and would eventually get relegated to Primera B in 1991, and to Segunda Categoría in 1992, although they only stayed there for one season. In 1998, the club won the second division championship, and was promoted to Primera A, under chairman Miller Salazar. The team consolidated its position in the 2000 season and the center forward, Christian José Bottero, finished as the top scorer in Primera in 1999. At this time they had a good group of players including Daniel Garrido, John Ordoñez, Lino Sánchez and Héctor Lautaro Chiriboga, that would remain for the next season. However, the Ecuadorian economic crisis of 1999 and 2000 was a painful hit for the club, and added to that, their key player, Lino Sánchez's, suffered an injury in 2000 that would finish his career. In 2002, the club was forced to sell their stars Garrido and Patricio Urrutia and their performance suffered and they were relegated from Primera A at the end of the year.
After that, Miller Salazar was less effective as manager, and was replaced by young businessman Ricardo Callejas. He brought fresh ideas and much needed investment and introduced better financial management. The team acquired fine players in Matías Urbano and Oscar Pacheco, among others. However, the club sold Urbano to Deportivo Quito by midyear, due to the player being unprepared to play in a lower division league. The team earned promotion for the 2004 season.
2004 was an unsatisfactory year, because, although having good players in Cristian Mora and Oscar Monge and others, it became difficult for the team to reach the last 6's group and be in contention for the title and the expenditure for appointing renowned coach Dussan Draskovic did not succeed as well as was hoped. The 2005 season saw the team relegated but they would be back again to the first division by 2007.

Today
For the second half of the Ecuadorian Campeonato Nacional in 2007, Macará started with Roque Raúl Alfaro as coach, but lack of positive results had him and the team in a very difficult position. The base of national players had a fairly good performance in most of the games, particularly Luís M. Garcés, Marvín Pita and goalkeeper Jacinto Espinoza, not to mention U18 players, one of which just returned form the Panamerican Games in Rio de Janeiro with a gold medal; but the problem wasn't the nationals, the problems came from the foreign players, with the exception of defender Matías Gonzáles, who even scored a few times, the rest were a disappointment. Paraguayan striker Fabio Escobar was unstable, some games he had solid performances, like the one against Barcelona S.C in Guayaquil, where he performed his tactical role of distracting the opposition´ defense very well, but when it came to scoring, he wasted most of his chances, but to be fair, it might have been more the coach's fault for giving him duties he was not used to. The worst case was Mariano Monroy who never found his place on the field and looked lost in every single game he played; Lezcano was not everything the team needed him to be. With that scenario, the team's management decided it was time to part ways with Roque Raúl Alfaro. After he left, they signed Argentinian, Raúl Urquiza, who did a much better job on the last stretch of the tournament, lining up players that were overlooked by the former coach and contributing to the development of more effective plays, which reached its peak at Ibarra's Olympic Stadium on 3 October 2007, when Macara's offensive power burst in full force, scoring 4 goals in the first half and receiving just 1 in the second. Now, both teams were at risk of descending to section B of Ecuadorian first division, Macará had a better goal difference and there was still one more game left, another very favourable fact was that Imbabura had to play away against Deportivo Azogues in the south part of the country and Macará was hosting Emelec in Bellevista Stadium in Ambato. With a large number of fans cheering for them on 7 October 2007 and confirming their good moment, they defeated Emelec 2–0 and Macará had for the second year in a row, kept its place on the premier section of Ecuador's Campeonato Nacional.

Considering that, next tournament would be much more competitive, given that there will be two more teams, game attendance is a must, because it is key to a team's spirit and positive attitude on the field, as well as from the city's business community where Macará has many fans and which could be a positive contributor in order to form a strong, competitive group of players.

For 2008, Macará hired Colombian coach Jaime De La Pava to the club, and replaced a significant part of the squad. They saw three of their best players leave the club, Luis Miguel Garcés went to cash-rich Barcelona, Mariano Mina transferred to Deportivo Cuenca and Christian Botero switched to Universidad Católica, where he played for a few months before going into retirement (and swiftly returning to Macará as an academy coach).
The team struggled for the major part of the first semester, which meant repeated fates for successively fired coaches De La Pava and Argentinian Jorge García.
For the second part of the year, and with the arrival of Mario Jaquet to lead the coaching staff, Macará looked impressive and secured first place in their qualification group and consequently, earned themselves a place for the finals, something not achieved since 1989. However, Macará did not qualify for the Copa Libertadores de América. Jaquet was later confirmed as first team coach for the 2009 season.

During the 2011 season, Macara was in Primera B and moved up as the runners up at the end of the season with its rival Tecnico Universitario.

Kit
Macará's kit manufacturer has been Marathon Sports since 2009 when they finished their relationship with Astro. 
Historically, Macará has had their kit produced by local and national manufacturers, but since late 1990s it has changed at the rate of almost a brand per year. These include: Marathon Sports, Puma, Diadora, Le Coq Sportif, Joma and Astro.
The majors sponsor are Universidad Tecnológica Indoamérica, local footwear company Venus, Makrotubo, L. Gilbert, Hotel Casino Emperador and Ecuavisa, which also broadcasts the team's home games.
As regards kit producers, the sponsorship deals vary from year to year, with the most recent main sponsors being Cerveza Pilsener, Banco del Pichincha, Mazda, Sunny Juices and Daihatsu.

Rivalries
The club has two major rivalries: fellow ground-sharers and city rivals Técnico Universitario, the derby games referred to as the Clásico Ambateño; and Centro Deportivo Olmedo with whom they contest the Clásico Interandino.

Achievements
Serie B
Winners (4): 1971, 1998, 2005 Clausura, 2016
Runners-up (2): 2003, 2011
Campeonato Profesional Interandino
Winners (1): 1959

Players

Current squad

Noted players

Top scorers
Macará has had one players become the top scorer in the national championship. They are:
 Anthony Velasquez (2006)

Managers
 Roque Alfaro (April 11, 2007 - August 7, 2007)
 Juan Urquiza (August 7, 2007 - October 7, 2007)
 Jaime de la Pava (December 27, 2007 - March 5, 2008)
 Mario Jacquet (April 15, 2008 - April 8, 2009)
 Víctor Marchesini (April 12, 2009 - March 15, 2010)
 Carlos Sevilla (March 16, 2010 - June 29, 2010)
 Boris Fiallos (June 29, 2010 - July 6, 2010)
 Víctor Riggio (July 6, 2010 - September 14, 2010)
 Janio Pinto (September 14, 2010 - June 11, 2011)
 Homero Mistral Valencia (June 8, 2011 - July 8, 2012)
 Fabián Bustos (July 10, 2012 – April 28, 2013)
 Armando Osma (April 29, 2013 – Oct 22, 2013)
 Óscar Pacheco (October 23, 2013 – November 8, 2013)
 Christian Gómez (November 8, 2013 - December 31, 2013)
 Luis Espinel (January 11, 2014 - July 4, 2014)
 Christian Gómez (July 4, 2014 - June 11, 2015)
 Fernando Salazar (June 11, 2015 - June 14, 2015)
 Marcelo Straccia (June 15, 2015 - December 13, 2015)
 Paúl Vélez (January 1, 2016 - December 25, 2020)
 Eduardo Favaro (December 25, 2020 - August 1, 2021)
 Paúl Vélez (August 9, 2021 - August 1, 2022)
 Marcelo Fleitas (August 2, 2022 -

References

External links
 For more information.
 Official website 
 Macara Info
 Revista Estadio

 
Association football clubs established in 1939
Football clubs in Ecuador
1939 establishments in Ecuador